General Nicholson may refer to:

Cameron Nicholson (1898–1979), British Army general
Francis Nicholson (1655–1727]), British Army lieutenant general
John Nicholson (East India Company officer) (1822–1857), East India Company brigadier general
John W. Nicholson Jr. (born 1957), U.S. Army four-star general
John Sanctuary Nicholson (1863–1924), British Expeditionary Force brigadier general
John W. Nicholson  (born c. 1934), U.S. Army brigadier general
Lawrence D. Nicholson (born 1956), U.S. Marine Corps lieutenant general
Lothian Nicholson (British Army officer, died 1933) (1865–1933), British Army major general
Lothian Nicholson (1827–1893), British Army lieutenant general
William Jones Nicholson (1856–1931), U.S. Army brigadier general
William L. Nicholson (1926–2020), U.S. Air Force major general
William Nicholson, 1st Baron Nicholson (1845–1918), British Army general